The Gulf of Paria crossing is a hypothetical bridge or tunnel spanning the Gulf of Paria that would connect the island of Trinidad and South America.

Background
Trinidad was connected to Venezuela (as also with Tobago) during the last ice age by natural "land bridges" between them. A mere short distance, and visible across the Gulf of Paria on a clear day. At various stages of Trinidad's post independent history, members with the government of the Republic of Trinidad and Tobago have spoken of constructing a physical link between the islands of Trinidad and Tobago to physically unify the country. As public discussion and commentary ensued over feasibility and cost, an alternative proposal was made of constructing a shorter connection which would connect Trinidad and Venezuela.

Routes
Paria Peninsula (Sucre State), Venezuela—Spanning the Bocas del Dragón (Dragon's Mouths) strait—Isle of Chacachacare, (Bocas Islands) Trinidad.
Orinoco Delta, (Delta Amacuro), Venezuela—spanning the Boca del Serpiente (Serpent's Mouth) strait -- Icacos Point (Saint Patrick County), Trinidad

See also
 Pan-American Highway (South America)
 Initiative for the Integration of the Regional Infrastructure of South America
 General Rafael Urdaneta Bridge (Venezuela)
 Second Orinoco crossing (Venezuela)
 Confederation Bridge (Prince Edward Island, Canada)
 Bering Strait crossing
 Strait of Gibraltar crossing
 List of longest bridges in the world
 List of longest tunnels

References

 
 
 
 

Proposed bridges in South America
Gulf of Parial
Gulf of Paria
Transport in Trinidad and Tobago
Transport in Venezuela
International tunnels
Trinidad and Tobago–Venezuela border